Gordenellidae is an extinct taxonomic family of sea snails, marine gastropod mollusks in the informal group Lower Heterobranchia.

Genera
Genera within the family Gordenellidae include: 

 Gordenella, the type genus
 Turritelloidea

References 

 The Taxonomicon
 The Paleobiology Database info